Marina Frantsivna Poplavska (March 9, 1970, Novohrad-Volynskyi, Zhytomyr Oblast, Ukrainian SSR, USSR – October 20, 2018, near Mila, Kyiv-Sviatoshyn Raion, Kyiv Oblast, Ukraine) was a Ukrainian actress, producer, comedian, teacher.

Biography 
Marina Poplavska was born on March 9, 1970, in Novohrad-Volynskyi. Marina Poplavskaya admitted that her roots originate from the Polish nobility, her great-grandfather Vicenty Levandovsky was a Polish Baron. She graduated from the faculty of Philology of the Ivan Franko Zhytomyr state University with a degree in Ukrainian language and literature.

After graduating from the university, she started working in Zhytomyr school #26, and then #33. She worked there as a teacher of Ukrainian language and literature for more than 20 years. Marina also hosted a local drama club.

In 1993, Marina was invited to the KVN team "Girls from Zhytomyr".

In 1997, they played in the KVN Premier League. Later, the team repeatedly takes part in the "Golosyashchy KiViN" music festival, winning in 1997 and 2011. After successful performances, Marina is invited to NTV to participate in the sketch show For three.

Since 2016, she has participated in the humorous program Diesel show.

Death 
On October 20, 2018, around 6:43 am, she was killed in a car accident in the Kyiv Oblast near the village Mila, when a bus with actors from a Diesel show crashed into a truck. It is known that the bus was moving at a speed of over 100 kilometers per hour.

Farewell to the actress was held on October 21, 2018, at 10:45 in the October Palace in Kyiv. The next day, the farewell was held in Zhytomyr in the hall of the Zhytomyr academic music and drama theater named after I. Kocherga. Then there was a funeral service in the Hagia Sophia Cathedral.

On the same day (October 22, 2018), the actress was buried at the Korbutovsky cemetery on the Central Alley in Zhytomyr.

Personal life 
Marina was a Catholic. She did not like to talk about her personal life, but it is known that she never married and had no children.

Awards 
 Winner Of the international music festival KVN (named after Richter), twice champion of the KVN Association of Ukraine, head and producer of the TV team KVN "Girls from Zhitomir" (winner of "Golosyashchy KiViN" in Jurmala 1997 and 2011).
 On November 8, 2018, at the session of the Zhytomyr city Council, Marina Poplavska was awarded the title "Honorary citizen of Zhytomyr" (posthumously).
 President of Ukraine Petro Poroshenko awarded Marina Poplavska the Order of merit of the III degree (posthumously, 2018).

Notes

References

1970 births
2018 deaths
21st-century Ukrainian actresses
Ukrainian television actresses
Recipients of the Order of Merit (Ukraine), 3rd class
Ukrainian women comedians
Road incident deaths in Ukraine